Salianeh may refer to:

Salianeh, Delfan, in Iran
Salianeh, Selseleh, in Iran